Andreas Neitzel (born 14 February 1964) is a former East German male handball player. He was a member of the East Germany national handball team. He was part of the East German team at the 1988 Summer Olympics.

References

Living people
Handball players at the 1988 Summer Olympics
People from Berlin
1964 births
Olympic handball players of East Germany